Delano Eugene Lewis (born November 12, 1938) is an American attorney, businessman, and diplomat. He was the United States Ambassador to South Africa from 1999 to 2001, and previously held leadership roles at the Peace Corps and National Public Radio. He is the father of actor Phill Lewis.

Early life and education
Lewis was born in Arkansas City, Kansas, into a family of "ardent Democrats". He was named for Franklin Delano Roosevelt (although his name is pronounced "Del-AYE-no".) He is the only child of Raymond Ernest Lewis, a porter for the Santa Fe Railroad, and Enna L. Lewis (née Wordlow), a homemaker.

Lewis attended Sumner High School, in Kansas City, Kansas, graduating in 1956. He attended Boys State in his junior and senior years of high school.

Lewis graduated from the University of Kansas, in Lawrence, Kansas, in 1960, where he was a classmate of Wilt Chamberlain. He earned a law degree from the Washburn University School of Law, in Topeka, Kansas, in 1963. He worked full-time at the Menninger Clinic while attending law school.

Career
After graduation, Lewis went to work as an attorney in the U.S. Justice Department and later in the Office of Compliance in the Equal Employment Opportunity Commission. He was an associate director and country director for the Peace Corps in Nigeria and Uganda from 1966 to 1969. 
 
Lewis was a legislative assistant to Senator Edward Brooke and Delegate Walter E. Fauntroy. He led Marion Barry's mayoral transition team in 1978 and his re-election campaign's financial committee in 1982.

He joined The Chesapeake & Potomac Telephone Company in 1973 as a public affairs manager, becoming its chief executive officer in 1990. In 1988, Lewis served a one-year term as president of the Greater Washington Board of Trade, and began a term as president of the newly formed City National Bank of Washington, which eventually closed in 1993.
 
In 1993, Lewis became the president and chief executive officer of National Public Radio. During his tenure, he served for three years on the board of Apple Computer, citing "pressing time demands" as the reason for leaving in 1997. He resigned from NPR in 1998.

Lewis was also a member of the board of directors of Black Entertainment Television, and has served on the boards of Colgate-Palmolive, Halliburton and Eastman Kodak.

U.S. President Bill Clinton named Lewis the U.S. Ambassador to South Africa, a post in which he served from 1999 to 2001. He was sworn in by federal judge John Edwards Conway, a law-school classmate. Later, Lewis and his wife moved to Las Cruces, New Mexico, where he started a consultancy, Lewis & Associates. In 2006, he was named a senior fellow at New Mexico State University. The following year, he was named founding director of New Mexico State University's International Relations Institute.

Politics
Lewis was involved in the effort to establish home rule for Washington, D.C.; the District of Columbia Home Rule Act was adopted by the U.S. Congress in 1973. He was a chair of the home rule committee for VOICE, the Voice of Informed Community Expression, a group formed after the 1968 riots in Washington. 

He later ran for a seat on the Council of the District of Columbia (Washington's city council), losing to Barry. It was his only run for political office, although he was considered a leading candidate for Mayor of the District of Columbia for years, and was often described as a power broker in Washington, D.C. politics. When he resigned from NPR, he declared that he would not be running for any public office.

Personal life
Lewis is a member of Alpha Phi Alpha fraternity and was elected president while at University of Kansas.

Among the many civic awards Lewis has earned, The Washingtonian named him  a "Washingtonian of the Year" in 1978; he was awarded Catholic University's President's Medal in 1978, as well. In January 2009, he was celebrated as Kansan of the Year.

Lewis and his wife, the former Gayle Carolyn Jones, were married in 1960, and they have four sons: Delano Jr., Geoffrey, Brian, and actor Phill. A Baptist by birth and upbringing, Lewis converted to Catholicism when he married.

See also

 List of Washburn University alumni
 List of University of Kansas people

References

External links

1938 births
Living people
20th-century American businesspeople
21st-century American businesspeople
African-American bankers
American bankers
African-American Catholics
African-American diplomats
African-American founders
American founders
African-American media personalities
African-American lawyers
African-American people in Washington, D.C., politics
Alpha Phi Alpha presidents
Ambassadors of the United States to South Africa
American chief executives
American telecommunications industry businesspeople
American expatriates in Nigeria
BET Networks
Businesspeople from Kansas
Businesspeople from Washington, D.C.
Clinton administration personnel
Colgate-Palmolive
Converts to Roman Catholicism from Baptist denominations
Directors of Apple Inc.
Equal Employment Opportunity Commission members
Halliburton people
Kansas Democrats
Kansas lawyers
Kodak people
New Mexico Democrats
New Mexico lawyers
New Mexico State University people
NPR
Peace Corps people
People from Arkansas City, Kansas
People from Kansas City, Kansas
People from Las Cruces, New Mexico
History of Uganda
United States Department of Justice lawyers
University of Kansas alumni
Washburn University School of Law alumni
Washington, D.C., Democrats
Lawyers from Washington, D.C.
Catholics from New Mexico
Catholics from Kansas